Marcia Neugebauer (born September 27, 1932) is a prominent American geophysicist who made contributions to space physics. Neugebauer's research was among the first that yielded the first direct measurements of the solar wind and shed light on its physics and interaction with comets.

Life 
Neugebauer was born in New York City. She received a B.A. in physics from Cornell University in 1954, followed by an M.S. in physics from the University of Illinois in Urbana in 1956. She was awarded an honorary Doctorate of Physics in 1998 by the University of New Hampshire.

She was married to astrophysicist Gerry Neugebauer.

Work 
Neugebauer was an investigator of the Mariner 2 plasma analyzer that made the first extensive measurements of the solar wind and discovery of its properties. She also developed analytical instruments that orbited Earth, some set up on the moon by the Apollo astronauts, and others that flew by Halley's comet on the European Giotto mission.

Neugebauer was Study Scientist for many space missions during her long career with NASA and held several management positions at the   Propulsion Laboratory, including Manager of the Physics and Space Physics sections, Manager of the Mariner Mark II study team, and Project Scientist for Rangers 1 and 2 and the Comet Rendezvous Asteroid Flyby mission.

Neugebauer served as president of the American Geophysical Union from 1994-1996 and was Editor-in-Chief of its journal Reviews of Geophysics. She also chaired the National Academy of Sciences' Committee on Solar and Space Physics.

Awards and honors
In 1967 the Museum of Science and Industry named Neugebauer  "California Woman Scientist of the Year." She received many awards from NASA, including the Exceptional Scientific Achievement Award, the Outstanding Leadership Medal, and the Distinguished Service Medal (the highest award given by NASA). In 1997 she was inducted in the Women in Technology International Hall of Fame. In 2004 Neugebauer was awarded the William Kaula Award and in 2010 was awarded the Arctowski Medal from the National Academy of Sciences "for definitively establishing the existence of the solar wind, critical to understanding the physics of the heliosphere, and for elucidating many of its key properties." 

In 2010 Neugebauer was awarded the George Ellery Hale Prize of the Solar Physics Division of the American Astronomical Society "for her seminal contributions to the discovery of the solar wind and her extensive and ongoing contributions to solar-heliospheric physics."

References

External links
 Oral history interview transcript with Marcia Neugebauer on 18 July 2017, American Institute of Physics, Niels Bohr Library & Archives
 Pioneers of space physics: A career in the solar wind - Marcia Neugebauer (J. of Geophysical Research)
 Contributions Of 20th Century Women To Physics - Marcia Neugebauer (UCLA Archive)
 WITI Hall of Fame - Marcia Neugebauer
 American Geophysical Union, Past President Biographies: 1980-2000
 Interview at Jet Propulsion Laboratory, January 18, 1999
 Neugebauer Receives 2004 Kaula Award

American geophysicists
1932 births
Living people
American women physicists
Cornell University alumni
University of Illinois Urbana-Champaign alumni
20th-century American  physicists
21st-century American  physicists
20th-century American women scientists
21st-century American women scientists
Women geophysicists